Maciej Kononowicz (born 18 March 1988) is a Polish former footballer who played as a striker/left winger.

References 

1988 births
Living people
People from Świebodzin
Polish footballers
Association football midfielders
Ekstraklasa players
Amica Wronki players
Lech Poznań players
Chrobry Głogów players
Czarni Żagań players
Polonia Środa Wielkopolska players
Sportspeople from Lubusz Voivodeship